Stelis pennelliana is a species of orchid plant native to Colombia.

References 

pennelliana
Flora of Colombia